The 2012–13 FC Augsburg season was the 106th season in the club's football history. In 2012–13 the club played in the Bundesliga, the top tier of German football. It was the clubs second consecutive season in this league, having been promoted from the 2. Bundesliga in 2011. FC Augsburg also participated in the season's edition of the DFB-Pokal. It was the fourth season for FC Augsburg in the SGL arena.

Review and events

The club also participated in the 2012–13 edition of the DFB-Pokal, the German Cup, where it reached the third round before losing to third division side Preußen Münster.

Matches

Legend

Bundesliga

League results and fixtures

League table

Overall league table

League summary table

DFB-Pokal

Squad information

Squad and statistics

Squad, appearances and goals

Source: 

|}

Bookings

Transfers

In

Out

Notes
1.FC Augsburg goals listed first.

Sources

Match reports

Other sources

External links
 2012–13 FC Augsburg season at Weltfussball.de 
 2012–13 FC Augsburg season at kicker.de 
 2012–13 FC Augsburg season at Fussballdaten.de 

Augsburg
FC Augsburg seasons